Zera Yisrael (meaning "Seed [of] Israel") is a legal category in Jewish law that denotes the blood descendants of Jews who, for one reason or another, are not legally of Jewish ethnicity according to religious criteria.

See also
 Anusim
 Crypto-Judaism
 Ten Lost Tribes
 Who is a Jew?

References

External links
Zera Israel Foundation Official Website

Ethno-cultural designations
Jewish genetics
Jewish law
Judaism-related controversies